Muscat International Airport , formerly Seeb International Airport, is the main international airport in Oman and is located in Seeb, 32 km from the old city and capital Muscat within the Muscat metropolitan area. The airport serves as the hub for flag carrier Oman Air and Oman's first budget airline, Salam Air, and features flights to several regional destinations as well as some intercontinental services to Asia, Africa and Europe.

History
The airport opened as Seeb International Airport in 1973, replacing a smaller airfield located in Bayt al Falaj.

It has hosted Royal Air Force BAe Nimrods in the past, including for the 1991 Gulf War. These aircraft cooperated with the Royal Navy of Oman in the 'Magic Roundabout' exercise series. The base was used by a detachment of Vickers VC10 tankers from No. 101 Squadron RAF during the Gulf War training with Royal Air Force SEPECAT Jaguars.

On 1 February 2008, the airport was given its present name.

Facilities
The entire airport is spread over an area of 5,250 acres (21 km2). It originally featured one passenger terminal building, one runway as well as minor cargo and maintenance facilities. Part of the airport complex extension featured housing for airport employees and Oman Air employees. 

During the expansion, a new terminal and control tower was built along with a new runway. The current terminal is the biggest airport in Oman, construction was started in 2007 and opened in 2018. The new facilities also include a VIP terminal for private jets and an onsite airport hotel.

The Royal Flight of Oman and Royal Air Force of Oman are based at the airport and the RAFO also shares its facilities with the airport. A Royal Terminal and Royal Flight hangars are located adjacent to the old terminal.

Since 2019 the Aaronia AARTOS C-UAS drone detection system is installed which makes it the first international airport in the world to have an operational drone detection system.

Terminals

Terminal 1 (new terminal)
The airport's newer and significantly larger terminal located north of the existing terminal and first runway, opened in 2018. This new building initially brought the airport's capacity up to 20 million passengers a year upon completion of the first phase. Subsequent enlargements under second and third phases will increase the airport capacity to 24 and 48 million annual passengers respectively. The terminal covers 580,000 sqm and features 118 check-in counters, 10 baggage reclaim belts, 82 immigration counters, 45 gates and a new, 97-meter control tower. The new terminal is located between the old and new runways and is capable of handling large aircraft such as Airbus A380s and Boeing 747s. The terminal opened on 18 March 2018, with the first flight, an Oman Air flight from Najaf, arriving at 6:30 p.m.

Terminal 2 (old terminal)
Terminal 2 is a single-building, two-story, T-shaped passenger terminal. Built in 1970, it opened in 1973 as a replacement of the Bait al-Falaj airport and has been expanded several times during the last years to cater for growing passenger numbers. This terminal featured 58 check-in counters, 23 departure gates, 4 baggage reclaim belts and several service counters and shops. During its years of operation, passengers and crew were transported to and from the aircraft using shuttle buses as the terminal lacks jet bridges.

The last international flight to depart from the old terminal was an Oman Air flight to Zurich, Switzerland, while another Oman Air flight bound for Salalah became the last domestic flight. The old facility was planned to be redeveloped into a low-cost carrier terminal, but was instead turned into a field hospital and COVID-19 vaccination site ever since the outbreak of the COVID-19 virus.

Runways and apron
The airport has two runways. The original runway, designated as Runway 08R/26L, is capable of handling the Boeing 747-400 and 777. The second runway, located to the north of the new terminal building, numbered 08L/26R, opened on December 14, 2014, and can handle larger airplanes such as the Boeing 747-8, Airbus A380, and the Antonov An-225. The original runway between the new facilities and the old passenger terminal closed in 2015 for refurbishment and expansion as part of the construction of the entirely new main terminal building and apron area.

The old terminal's apron features 32 stands on both sides of the T-shaped passenger terminal building with 30 new ones constructed in two phases in front of the new terminal building of which several are already in use as of September 2016.

Airlines and destinations

Passenger
The following airlines operate regular scheduled and charter flights to and from Muscat:

Notes
  Biman Bangladesh Airlines' flight from Muscat to Dhaka  makes a stop at Sylhet. However, the flight from Dhaka  to Muscat is non-stop.

Cargo

Statistics

Access
Oman National Transport Company (Mwasalat) operates 24-hour service special airport buses at fixed intervals. The Route A1 operates between Mabela and Ruwi bus station with a stop at Muscat Airport. Bus Route 8 (Al Mouj-Al Khuwair) also has a stop at Muscat Airport. Metered-airport taxis are available with special counters at the baggage and arrival halls. Car hire and chauffeur services are also available.

References

External links

Official website
Traffic Statistic 2018 Salalah & Muscat
Annual Report 2017 MOTC for Reference

1973 establishments in Oman
Airports established in 1973
Airports in Oman
Buildings and structures in Muscat, Oman
Economy of Muscat, Oman
Transport in Muscat, Oman
Seeb